Foggia railway station  serves the city and comune of Foggia, in the region of Apulia, Southern Italy.  Opened in 1864, it forms part of the Adriatic Railway (Ancona–Lecce), and is the terminus of the Naples–Foggia railway.  It is also a junction for several other, secondary lines, namely the Foggia–Manfredonia, Lucera–Foggia and Foggia–Potenza railways.

The station is currently managed by Rete Ferroviaria Italiana (RFI).  However, the commercial area of the passenger building is managed by Centostazioni.  Train services are operated by Trenitalia.  Each of these companies is a subsidiary of Ferrovie dello Stato (FS), Italy's state-owned rail company.

Location
Foggia railway station is situated at Piazzale Vittorio Veneto, at the north eastern edge of the city centre.

History
The station was opened on 25 April 1864, upon the inauguration of the Ortona–Foggia section of the Adriatic Railway. Just under four months later, on 11 August 1864, the Adriatic Railway was extended from Brindisi to Trani.

On 30 December 1886, Foggia became a junction station, when the first two sections of the Naples–Foggia railway were opened, between Bovino-Deliceto and Foggia via Cervaro.  The number of lines terminating at Foggia was expanded on 12 July 1885, with the opening of the Foggia–Manfredonia railway, and again on 2 August 1887, upon the completion of the Lucera–Foggia railway.

On 18 September 1897, a line branching from the Naples–Foggia railway at Cervaro was completed to form a link between Foggia and Potenza.  By the end of the nineteenth century, the station had therefore become a crucial junction between the lines that running between the north and south of Italy and those linking the Adriatic and Tyrrhenian seas.

During World War II, the passenger building was severely damaged.  It was rebuilt in 1951, as a project of the architect Roberto Narducci.

Features

The passenger building looks impressive in combination with the piazza in which it stands. It consists of a central section housing the main entrance, and two wings a little set back from it. On the ground floor are passenger services such as ticketing and bar and the office of traffic management and the headquarters of the Railway Police, while the upper floors are occupied by offices of Trenitalia.

In the station yard, there are eight through tracks, interspersed with four platforms equipped with shelters and linked by a subway. Additionally, there are several dock platforms used for passenger traffic.

The station is also equipped with a large goods yard with adjoining buildings and several through tracks used for overtaking.

Train services
The station has about four million passenger movements each year, due mainly to passenger interchanges between different lines.  It is therefore the second busiest station in Apulia after Bari Centrale.

The next busiest Apulian stations are Barletta, Brindisi, Lecce and Taranto, respectively.

The station is served by the following services (incomplete):

High speed services (Frecciargento) Rome - Foggia - Bari - Brindisi - Lecce
High speed services (Frecciabianca) Milan - Parma - Bologna - Ancona - Pescara - Foggia - Bari - Brindisi - Lecce
High speed services (Frecciarossa) Milan - Bologna - Ancona - Pescara - Foggia – Bari
High speed services (Frecciabianca) Milan - Parma - Bologna - Ancona - Pescara - Foggia - Bari - Taranto
High speed services (Frecciabianca) Turin - Parma - Bologna - Ancona - Pescara - Foggia - Bari - Brindisi - Lecce
High speed services (Frecciabianca) Venice - Padua - Bologna - Ancona - Pescara - Foggia - Bari - Brindisi - Lecce
Intercity services Rome - Foggia - Bari (- Taranto)
Intercity services Bologna - Rimini - Ancona - Pescara - Foggia - Bari - Brindisi - Lecce
Intercity services Bologna - Rimini - Ancona - Pescara - Foggia - Bari - Taranto
Night train (Intercity Notte) Rome - Foggia - Bari - Brindisi - Lecce
Night train (Intercity Notte) Milan - Parma - Bolgona - Ancona - Pescara - Foggia - Bari - Brindisi - Lecce
Night train (Intercity Notte) Milan - Ancona - Pescara - Foggia - Bari - Taranto - Brindisi - Lecce
Night train (Intercity Notte) Turin - Alessandria - Bolgona - Ancona - Pescara - Foggia - Bari - Brindisi - Lecce
Regional services (Treno regionale) Foggia - Barletta - Bari
Regional services (Treno regionale) Foggia - Melfi - Potenza
Local services (Treno regionale) San Severo - Foggia
Local services (Treno regionale) Foggia - Lucera
Local services (Treno regionale) Foggia - Manfredonia

See also

History of rail transport in Italy
List of railway stations in Apulia
Rail transport in Italy
Railway stations in Italy

References

External links

History and pictures of Foggia railway station 

This article is based upon a translation of the Italian language version as at January 2011.

Railway Station
Railway stations in Apulia
Railway stations opened in 1864
Buildings and structures in the Province of Foggia